This is a list of Spanish football transfers for the summer sale prior to the 2021–22 season of La Liga. Only moves from La Liga are listed.

The summer transfer window will begin on 1 July 2021, although a few transfers were announced prior to that date, the transferred players will not officially become part of their new club until the window's opening. The window will close at midnight on 2 September 2021. Players without a club can join one at any time, either during or in between transfer windows. Clubs below La Liga level can also sign players on loan at any time. If needed, clubs can sign a goalkeeper on an emergency loan, if all others are unavailable.

Alavés 
Manager:  Javier Calleja  (2nd season)

In

Out

Athletic Bilbao 
Manager:  Marcelino  (2nd season)

In

Out

Atlético Madrid 
Manager:  Diego Simeone  (11th season)

In

Out

Barcelona 
Manager:  Ronald Koeman  (2nd season)

In

Out

Cádiz 
Manager:  Álvaro Cervera  (7th season)

In

Out

Celta Vigo 
Manager:  Eduardo Coudet  (2nd season)

In

Out

Elche 
Manager:  Fran Escribá  (2nd season)

In

Out

Espanyol 
Manager:  Vicente Moreno  (2nd season)

In

Out

Getafe 
Manager:  Míchel  (1st season)

In

Out

Granada 
Manager:  Robert Moreno (1st season)

In

Out

Levante 
Manager:  Paco López  (5th season)

In

Out

Mallorca 
Manager:  Luis García  (2nd season)

In

Out

Osasuna 
Manager:  Jagoba Arrasate  (4th season)

In

Out

Rayo Vallecano 
Manager:  Andoni Iraola (2nd season)

In

Out

Real Betis 
Manager:  Manuel Pellegrini  (2nd season)

In

Out

Real Madrid 
Manager:  Carlo Ancelotti  (1st season)

In

Out

Real Sociedad 
Manager:  Imanol Alguacil  (4th season)

In

Out

Sevilla 
Manager:  Julen Lopetegui  (3rd season)

In

Out

Valencia 
Manager:  José Bordalás  (1st season)

In

Out

Villarreal 
Manager:  Unai Emery  (2nd season)

In

Out

References

Transfers
Spain
2021